Here follows a list of notable Ragusans and Rectors of the Republic of Ragusa (also known as the Republic of Dubrovnik), a maritime republic centered on the city of Dubrovnik on the eastern coast of the Adriatic.

Note on first and last names
Reflecting the dual Romance and Slavic influence on Ragusan culture, most Ragusan noble families, as well as members of the citizen class, used both Romance and Slavic versions of their first and last names, especially since the Late Middle Ages onward, while the lower classes mostly only used Slavic names. Some used only one version of their family name exclusively, e.g. the noble families Natali and Zlatarić. Since the official language of the Republic was always from the Romance language group, the official records record the last names almost exclusively in those versions, although in the older records the first names can be found in Slavic. Members of noble families, even those originally of Slavic descent, used the Slavic forms of their family names in an unofficial capacity in literary works written in Slavic, and in an official capacity only in treaties that the Ragusan State signed with its neighboring Slavic states in their language and script. In the noble class' everyday usage, most commonly the first name was in Slavic and the last name in Italian, a traditional practice which has continued until today, and transformed into official.
When only the Romance version of a first or last name appears in the sources, modern Croatian and Serbian scientific literature very frequently translates it creating a new slavicized version, which often results in various errors due to insufficient knowledge of Ragusan traditions, e.g. erroneously using non-Ragusan Slavic form "Vinko" instead of Ragusan Slavic form "Vicko", or "Blaž" instead of "Vlaho", or incorrectly adapting a Romance version while ignoring actual Ragusan usage, e.g. "Natal" instead of "Božo", "Junije" instead of "Džono".

When several persons had the same first and last name, it was Ragusan custom to append the father's name in the genitive case, also changing the declension of the last name (in Ragusan the genitive case for nouns ending in -o is -a), e.g. there were two persons named Đivo Gundulić, so one was called Đivo Frana Gundulića, and the other Đivo Nika Gundulića (in modern literature this is sometimes indicated with the possessive determiner -ov, thus Franov, Nikov, translated to English as Frano's, Niko's). When translating this into Latin, the genitive case was kept, e.g. Joannes Francisci Gundulae, however, when translating into languages in which names do not have grammatical cases (such as Italian) it was written as effectively a middle name (Giovanni Francesco Gondola). It is important to differentiate this from actual middle names, such as Roger Joseph Boscovich, an example where the names were also anglicized.

Some examples of Romance and Slavic versions of last names:

Bassegli, Basilio - Basiljević
Bobali, Babalio - Bobaljević
Bona - Bunić
Bonda - Bundić
Caboga - Kabužić
Cerva, Cervinus - Crijević
Ghetaldi - Getaldić
Giorgi - Đorđić, Đurđević
Gondola - Gundulić
Gozze - Gučetić
Gradi - Gradić
Luccari - Lukarević
Menze - Menčetić
Palmotta - Palmotić
Pozza - Pucić
Resti - Rastić, Restić
Sorgo - Sorkočević
Stay - Stojković
Zamagna - Zamanja, Zamanjić

Notable Ragusans

14th century
 Franco Sacchetti (c.1335–1400) - poet and short story writer, his father was a Florentine merchant.

15th century
 Benedetto Cotrugli (1416–1469) - merchant, humanist, scientist, diplomat
 Džore Držić  (1461–1501) - poet and playwright
 Bonino De Boninis (1454–1528) - printer and publisher
 Mavro Vetranović  (1482/1483-1576) - Benedictine, writer
 Šiško Menčetić  (1457–1527) - poet and nobleman
 Elio Lampridio Cerva  (c. 1460 - 1520) - orator, lexicographer, poet of Latin laudes, 
 Paladino Gondola  (fl. 1423–1472) - diplomat and merchant

16th century
 Savino Bobali (1530–1585) - writer
 Nikola Nalješković  (1505–1587) - poet, playwright and scientist
 Marin Držić (1508–1567) - playwright and poet
 Cvijeta Zuzorić (1555-c.1600) - poet
 Marino Ghetaldi (1568–1626) - scientist, mathematician and physicist
 Ivan Bunić Vučić  (1591–1658) - politician and poet
 Dinko Zlatarić (1558–1613) - poet and translator
 Maria Gondola-Gozze (*1585) - poet
 Nikola Vitov Gučetić  (1549–1610) - statesman, philosopher, scientist
 Ivan Gundulić  (1589–1638) - writer, poet, statesman, nobleman
 Dinko Ranjina (1536–1607) - poet
 Nikša Ranjina (1494–1577) - collector of poems
 Trojan Gundulić - merchant, printer
 Mavro Orbini (mid-16th century -1614) - writer, ideologist and historian

 Luco Ghetaldi - writer
 Božo Tudisi - writer
 Niko Primi - writer
 Đulia Bona - poet
 Miho Monaldi - writer

17th century
 Vladislav Menčetić (1600/1617- 1666) - poet
 Giorgio Baglivi  (1668–1707) - physician and researcher
 Junije Palmotić  (1607–1657) - writer, nobleman and dramatist
 Dživo Šiškov Gundulić  (1677–1721) - nobleman, poet
 Šišmundo Gundulić  (1634–1682) - politician (Rector) poet, nobleman
 Brno Ghetaldi - clergyman and historian
 Stjepan Gradić  (1613–1683) - philosopher and scientist
 Frano Điva Gundulića  (1630–1700) - nobleman and soldier (Austrian marshal)
 Beno Rogacci  (1646–1719) - Jesuit, poet
 Ignjat Đurđević  (1675–1737) - poet and translator

18th century

 Serafino Cerva  (1696–1759) - historian and encyclopedist
 Sebastiano Dolci (1699–1777) - writer and Franciscan
 Đivo Frana Sorgo (1706–1771) - writer, poet
 Rajmundo Kunić (1719–1794) - writer and humanist
 Roger Joseph Boscovich (1711–1787) - physicist, astronomer, mathematician, philosopher, diplomat, poet, and Jesuit
 Đuro Ferić  (1739–1820) - Jesuit, general-bicar
 Šišmundo Ghetaldi-Gondola  (1795–1860) - politician, nobleman
 Vlaho Getaldić  (1788–1872) - nobleman, politician, poet
 Luko Stulić  (1772–1828) - scientist and physician
 Antun Kaznačić  (1784–1874) - writer
 Marc Bruère (1770–1823) - writer, diplomat, dramatist and nobleman
 Jeronim Ljubibratić (1716–1779) - nobleman, soldier (Austrian marshal)
 Ivan Mane Jarnović  (1740–1804) - composer
 Bernardo Zamagna (1735–1820) - theologian, Jesuit, and Dominican
 Giunio Resti  (1755–1814) - politician, writer, nobleman
 Elena Pucić-Sorkočević  (1786–1865) - composer
 Pijerko Franatice Sorga  (1749–1826) - nobleman, writer, poet
 Antun Sorkočević  (1775–1841) - diplomat, writer, composer
 Luka Sorkočević / Luca Sorgo (1734–1789) - diplomat and composer
 Benedetto Stay  (1714–1801) - Jesuit and theologian
 Joakim Stulić  (1730–1817) - lexicographer and linguist
 Bernardin Pavlović - Franciscan, writer
 Vito Marija Bettera-Vodopić (1771–1841) - soldier, politician, Dubrovnik patriot
 Bernhard Caboga-Cerva  (1785–1855) - nobleman and soldier (Austrian marshall)

Partial list of rectors of the Ragusan Republic (1358-1808)

See also

Republic of Ragusa
Dubrovnik
List of people from Dubrovnik

Sources
 Zbornik Župe dubrovačke, Author Pero Butigan, Franica Grbić, Ivo Grbić, Josipa Kerner, Ivan Bošković, Mirjana Butigan
 Heyer von Rosenfeld, Carl Georg Friedrich, Der Adel des Königreiches Dalmatien, J. Siebmacher's grosses und allgemeines Wappenbuch, Nürnberg, 1873.

References

History of Dubrovnik
Ragusans

Ragusans